Bagnoli Irpino is a town and comune in the province of Avellino, Campania, Italy.

The bordering municipalities of Bagnoli are Acerno, Calabritto, Caposele, Lioni, Montella and Nusco.

The only frazione is Laceno, a village and ski resort situated in the Picentini mountains.

References

External links

 Official website  

Cities and towns in Campania